Horsley is a surname. Notable people with the surname include:

 Alec Horsley of Hull, founder of Northern Foods
Beresford Horsley (1880-1923), English cricketer and businessman
Charles Edward Horsley (1822–1876), English composer 
Cuthbert Horsley, English MP in the sixteenth century
David Horsley (1873–1933), Anglo-American pioneer of the motion picture industry
George Horsley (1836-1895), English ship owner, alderman and mayor of Hartlepool
Jean Horsley (1913–1997), New Zealand artist
John Horsley (disambiguation), multiple people
Lee Horsley, (born 1955), American actor
Matt Horsley (born 1972), Australian footballer
Matthew Henry Horsley (1867-1925), English timber merchant, ship owner, mayor of Hartlepool and philatelist
Neal Horsley (born 1944), American political figure of the far right
Sir Peter Horsley (1921–2001), Air Marshal of the Royal Air Force, Equerry to the Duke of Edinburgh and Ufologist
Richard A. Horsley (born 1939), American theologist and philologist
Ron Horsley (born 1977), American author and artist
Rupert Horsley (1905-1988), English First Class Cricketer
Samuel Horsley (1733–1806), British churchman and bishop of Rochester
Sebastian Horsley (1962–2010), English writer and artist
Valerie Horsley, American developmental biologist
Victor Horsley (1857–1916), English neurosurgeon and scientist
William Horsley (1774–1858), English organist and composer